Kjalnesinga saga is one of the sagas of Icelanders (Islandinga Sögur). It is preserved in a parchment manuscript AM 471 4to.

The work concerns historical ages from the ninth to eleventh centuries, and was composed in the fourteenth century, among the last group of sagas composed. The saga is about Búi Andríðsson, his wife Fríðr and his son Jökull Búason. The story takes place in Iceland and Norway. Búi becomes a chieftain of Iceland but dies in a quarrel with his son Jökul. The tale continues with the adventures of Jökul in the short story (Þáttr ) Jökuls þáttr Búasonar.

References

Translations
 (Saga of the People of Kjalarnes, pp. 21–52)

External links
Proverbs in Kjalnesinga saga
Full text at the Icelandic Saga Database

Sagas of Icelanders